The Cape May County Technical School District is a regional public school district that offers occupational and academic instruction for public high school and adult students in Cape May County, New Jersey, United States.

As of the 2021–22 school year, the district, comprised of one school, had an enrollment of 531 students and 65.0 classroom teachers (on an FTE basis), for a student–teacher ratio of 8.2:1.

School
Cape May County Technical High School had an enrollment of 535 students as of the 2021–22 school year.
Steven Vitiello, Principal:

Administration
Core members of the district's administration are:
Jamie Moscony, Superintendent
Lauren Flynn, Business Administrator / Board Secretary

References

External links

Cape May County Technical School District

School Data for the Cape May County Technical School District, National Center for Education Statistics

Middle Township, New Jersey
School districts in Cape May County, New Jersey
Vocational school districts in New Jersey